Loyola Sacred Heart High School is a private, Roman Catholic high school in Missoula, Montana.  It is one of two high schools in the Roman Catholic Diocese of Helena, the other being Butte Central Catholic in Butte. It is  affiliated with St. Joseph Elementary School, and both institutions are supported by the Loyola Sacred Heart Foundation. The Boys and Girls sports teams go by different names, being the Rams and the Breakers, respectively.

History

Loyola Sacred Heart was founded in 1873. It originally existed as two separated schools: Loyola High School, a boys-only institution founded by the Jesuits; and Sacred Heart Academy for Girls, founded by the Sisters of Providence.

In 1974 the two schools merged into a new school, ultimately called Loyola Sacred Heart High School. The first principal of the co-ed school was Orlando R. Barone of Philadelphia, Pennsylvania, who served for six years.

Montana High School Association State Championships
 Boys Football - 2012, 2013
 Boys Tennis - 2013, 2014, 2015
 Boys Golf - 2009, 2010, 2011, 2012, 2013
 Boys Cross Country - 1999, 2000, 2001, 2002, 2003, 2004, 2006, 2010
 Boys Track and Field - 1960, 1961, 2005
 Girls Golf - 2011, 2015
 Girls Cross Country - 1997, 2003, 2004, 2012
 Girls Softball - 2003
 Girls Track and Field - 2005, 2012
 Girls Volleyball - 2005
 Girls Basketball - 2006
 Speech and Debate - 1982-2018 The school's 35 year winning streak is the longest-running current high school state championship streak in the nation.

Notable alumni
Andrew Sopko, baseball player

References

External links
 Loyola Sacred Heart High School Website
 Loyola Sacred Heart Foundation Website
 St. Joseph Elementary School Website

Educational institutions established in 1873
High schools in Missoula, Montana
Catholic secondary schools in Montana
Jesuit high schools in the United States
Schools accredited by the Northwest Accreditation Commission
1873 establishments in Montana Territory
Roman Catholic Diocese of Helena